The Auckland City Vulcans were a New Zealand rugby league club that represented Auckland City in the 1994 Lion Red Cup. They were replaced in 1995 by the Auckland Warriors' Colts team.

Notable players
Notable players included Stacey Jones, Vinnie Weir, Mark Faumuina, Aaron Lester, Danny Lima, Jason Mackie, Doc Murray, Meti Noovao and Mike Setefano.

Season results

See also

Rugby league in New Zealand
List of Auckland Vulcans Results

References

External links

Auckland rugby league clubs
Defunct rugby league teams in New Zealand
Rugby clubs established in 1994
1994 establishments in New Zealand
1994 disestablishments in New Zealand